Elk City is a census-designated place in Idaho County, Idaho, United States. As of the 2020 census, its population was 170.



Geography
Elk City has a post office with ZIP code 83525.

Climate
This climatic region is typified by large seasonal temperature differences, with warm to hot (and often humid) summers and cold (sometimes severely cold) winters.  According to the Köppen Climate Classification system, Elk City has a humid continental climate, abbreviated "Dfb" on climate maps.

History
Elk City was the site of a gold strike in 1861, as prospectors rushed south from Pierce, two years before the formation of the Idaho Territory. In the 1870s, Chinese miners leased the claims but were later driven out by mistreatment. Quartz lode operations began in 1902 and dredging in 1935.

See also

 List of census-designated places in Idaho

References

External links

 Air Nav.com - Elk City Airport

Census-designated places in Idaho County, Idaho
Census-designated places in Idaho